Thierry Poyet (born March 25, 1965) is a Monegasque politician. He was elected to the National Council in the 2013 Monegasque election as a member for the ruling coalition, Horizon Monaco.

External links
 Biography on the National Council website
 Thierry Poyet on Twitter

Living people
1965 births
Monegasque politicians